Proxy Mobile IPv6 (or PMIPv6, or PMIP) is a network-based mobility management protocol standardized by IETF and is specified in RFC 5213. It is a protocol for building a common and access technology independent of mobile core networks, accommodating various access technologies such as WiMAX, 3GPP, 3GPP2 and WLAN based access architectures. Proxy Mobile IPv6 is the only network-based mobility management protocol standardized by IETF.

Introduction
Network-based mobility management enables the same functionality as Mobile IP, without any modifications to the host's TCP/IP Protocol stack. With PMIP the host can change its point-of-attachment to the Internet without changing its IP address. Contrary to Mobile IP approach, this functionality is implemented by the network, which is responsible for tracking the movements of the host and initiating the required mobility signalling on its behalf. However, in case the mobility involves different network interfaces, the host needs modifications similar to Mobile IP in order to maintain the same IP address across different interfaces.

The "SaMOG" (S2a Mobility based on GTP) study item in 3GPP defines the interworking between mobile packet core and a trusted WLAN access network (3GPP TR 23.852). The interface that SaMOG defines for this interworking is the 3GPP S2a GTP interface.

Proxy Mobile IPv6 Deployment Models

                +--------+       _----_                 |                +--------+       _----_
                |        |     _(      )_               |                |        |     _(      )_
                |        |----( Internet )              |                |        |----( Internet )              
                |  (LMA) |     (_      _)               |                |  (LMA) |     (_      _)               
                |        |       '----'                 |                |        |       '----'                 
                +--------+                              |                +--------+                              
                     |                                  |                    | 
             -- --  ---  -- --                          |                  _----_
          --                   --                       |                _(      )_
        --                       --                     |               ( internet )
      --        IP Network         --                   |                (_      _)
        --                       --                     |                  '----'
          --                   --                       |                     | 
              -- --  ---  -- --                         |               +-----------+
            /                   \                       |               |    MAG    |----    
    +-------------+       +-------------+               |               +-----------+    |--- (Session Chaining)
    |             |       |             |               |               |    LMA    |---- 
    |     MAG     |       |     MAG     |               |               +-----------+
    |             |       |             |               |                     |              
    +-------------+       +-------------+               |                  _----_
       |        |            |        |                 |                _(      )_    
    +-----+  +-----+      +-----+  +-----+              |            --(IP Network )--        
    |  AP |  |  AP |      |  AP |  |  AP |              |            |   (_      _)   |
    | (L2)|  | (L2)|      | (L2)|  | (L2)|              |            |     '----'     |
    +-----+  +-----+      +-----+  +-----+              |         +-----+           +-----+           
       .        .            .        .                 |         | MAG |           | MAG |   
      / \      / \          / \      / \                |         +-----+           +-----+                                
    MN                                                  |            /\
                                                        |            MN                    
                                                        |          
  Proxy Mobile IPv6: Flat Domain Model                  |    Proxy Mobile IPv6: Domain Chaining
                                                        |

Key Properties of Proxy Mobile IPv6 Technology
 Based on Open Internet Standards
 No client software requirement
 IP Address Continuity
 Session Continuity when roaming within a single access technology domain
 The mobile node can be an IPv4-client, IPv6 client or a dual stack client
 The transport network between LMA (Local Mobility Anchor) and MAG (Mobile Access Gateway) can be IPv4 or IPv6 
 The tunnel between the LMA and MAG is a shared tunnel
 The tunnel between LMA and MAG can be based on GRE or IP-in-IP
 No packet fragmentation, as PMIP advertises adjusted MTU values on the access side  
 Extremely Light Weight Protocol, MAG function can be implemented on a low-cost access point
 Minimal Handover Latency
 Signaling semantics are based on IPv6, but can be enabled on an IPv4 network
 PMIPv6 signaling can be protected using standard IPsec transport mode ESP
 Natural Support for Client Mobility. The LMA is a Mobile IPv6 Home Agent
 Protocol Interface supported in 3GPP LTE Architecture
 Standard Protocol Glue for linking access technology domains
 Industry Wide Participation in Standardization
 Adopted in 3GPP, WiMAX and 3GPP2 Architectures
 Central traffic aggregation for charging, policy enforcement, LI and DPI Enforcement
 Supported in all 3GPP LTE Packet Data Gateways (LMA function in PDN Gateway)
 Future proof

Proxy Mobile IPv6: Technology Overview

Functional Entities
The PMIPv6 architecture defines following functional entities:
 Local Mobility Anchor (LMA)
 Mobile Access Gateway (MAG)
 Mobile Node (MN)
 Correspondent Node (CN)

Messaging Call Flows

Protocol Operation
 A mobile host enters a PMIP domain
 A Mobile Access Gateway on that link checks host authorization
 A mobile host obtains an IP address
 A Mobile Access Gateway updates a Local Mobility Anchor about the current location of a host
 Both MAG and LMA create a bi-directional tunnel
 A Mobile Access Gateway sends a Router Advertise message to MN with Care-of-Address

Access Authentication
 Access authentication and mobile node's identity
 Mobile node's policy profile
 MAG and Authenticator Collocation

Security Considerations
 Control Plane Security
 Data Plane Security

Address Assignment
 IPv4 Address Assignment over DHCPv4
 Stateless Autoconf for IPv6

Proxy Mobile IPv6:  Technology Applications
 Selective IP Traffic Offload Support with Proxy Mobile IPv6
 Network-based Mobility Management in a local domain (Single Access Technology Domain)
 Inter-technology handoffs across access technology domains (Ex: LTE to WLAN, eHRPD to LTE, WiMAX to LTE)
 Access Aggregation replacing L2TP, Static GRE, CAPWAP based architectures, for 3G/4G  integration and mobility

Selective IP Traffic Offload (SIPTO) Support with Proxy Mobile IPv6
Mobile Operators today are facing two fundamental challenges:
 There is availability of only finite amount of licensed spectrum, limiting the number of mobile nodes that can be active at a point of time in the macro network. This is proving to be a major issue in high-density areas, such as San Francisco city.
 The exponential growth in the mobile data traffic is creating significant capacity problems in the mobile packet core

To address these scaling challenges, mobile operators are exploring new technology approaches for expanding their network coverage by integrating alternative access technologies into a common mobile core. Specifically, Wireless LAN networks based on IEEE 802.11 standards is showing lot of promise.

Secondly, for addressing the issue with the massive growth in mobile data traffic, mobile operators are exploring new ways to offload some of the IP traffic flows at the nearest WLAN access edge wherever there is an internet peering point, as opposed to carrying it all the way to the mobility anchor in the home network.  Not all IP traffic needs to be routed back to the home network; some of the non-essential traffic which does not require IP mobility support can be offloaded at the access edge gateway.  This approach provides greater leverage and efficient usage of the mobile packet core with increased overall network capacity and by lowering transport costs. Approaches such as, Selective IP Traffic Offload Option can be provide the basic offload semantics.

How to Implement Proxy Mobile IPv6

Mobile Access Gateway

Local Mobility Anchor

Proxy Mobile IPv6 Implementations
 Cisco PMIPv6
 Nokia Siemens Networks
 Starent (now part of Cisco)
 Number of other LTE PGW vendors
 OpenAirInterface Proxy Mobile IPv6 (OAI PMIPv6)
 OPMIP - an open-source implementation of the Proxy MIPv6 mobility management protocol
 UMIP - Mobile IPv6 and NEMO for Linux

Proxy Mobile IPv6 Specifications

Internet Standards (IETF)
 S. Gundavelli, K. Leung, V. Devarapalli, K. Chowdhury, and B. Patil  "Proxy Mobile IPv6", RFC 5213, August 2008
 R. Wakikawa and S. Gundavelli, "IPv4 Support for Proxy Mobile IPv6", RFC 5844, May 2010
 A. Muhanna, M. Khalil, S. Gundavelli and K. Leung, "Generic Routing Encapsulation (GRE) Key Option for Proxy Mobile IPv6", RFC 5845, June 2010
 A. Muhanna, M. Khalil, S. Gundavelli, and K. Leung, "Binding Revocation for IPv6 Mobility", RFC 5846, June 2010
 V. Devarapalli, R. Koodli, H. Lim, N. Kant, S. Krishnan & J. Laganier, "Heartbeat Mechanism for Proxy Mobile IPv6", RFC 5847, June 2010
 S. Gundavelli, M. Townsley, O. Troan and W. Dec, "Address Mapping of IPv6 Multicast Packets on Ethernet", RFC 6085, January 2011
 T. Schmidt, M. Waehlisch, S. Krishna, "Base Deployment for Multicast Listener Support in Proxy Mobile IPv6", RFC 6224, April 2011
 J. Korhonen & V. Devarapalli, "Local Mobility Anchor (LMA) Discovery for Proxy Mobile IPv6", RFC 6097, February 2011
 J. Korhonen, J. Bournelle, K. Chowdhury, A. Muhanna, U. Meyer, "MAG & LMA Interactions with Diameter Server", RFC 5779, February 2011
 V. Devarapalli, A. Patel & K. Leung, "Mobile IPv6 Vendor Specific Option", RFC 5094, December 2007
 J. Korhonen, S. Gundavelli, H. Yokota, and X. Cui, "Dynamic LMA Assignment Support in Proxy Mobile IPv6", RFC 6463, December 2011
 F. Abinader, S. Gundavelli, K. Leung, S. Krishnan, and D. Premec, "Bulk Registration Support in Proxy Mobile IPv6", RFC 6602, April 2012
 F. Xia, B. Sarikaya, J. Korhonen, S. Gundavelli and D. Damic, "RADIUS Support for Proxy Mobile IPv6", RFC 6572, April 2012
 G. Keeni, K. Koide, S. Gundavelli, and R. Wakikawa, "Proxy Mobile IPv6 Management Information Base", RFC 6475, January 2012
 M. Liebsch, S. Jeong & Q. Wu, "Localized Routing Problem Statement", RFC 6275, June 2011
 S. Krishnan, R. Koodli, P. Loureiro, Q. Wu & A. Dutta, "Localized Routing for Proxy Mobile IPv6", RFC 6705, September 2012
 S. Gundavelli, X. Zhou, J. Korhonen, R. Koodli, G. Feige, "IPv4 Traffic Offload Option for Proxy Mobile IPv6 (SIPTO)"  RFC 6909, April 2013
 S. Gundavelli, J. Korhonen, M. Grayson, K. Leung, & R. Pazhyannur, "Access Network Information Option for PMIPv6",  RFC 6757, October 2012
 X. Zhou, J. Korhonen, C. Williams, and S. Gundavelli, "Prefix Delegation for PMIPv6", RFC 7148 February 2014
 S. Gundavelli, "Reserved IPv6 Interface Identifier for Proxy Mobile IPv6", RFC 6543 March, 2012
 M. Liebsch, P. Seite, H. Yokota, J. Korhonen & S. Gundavelli, "QoS Support for Proxy Mobile IPv6", RFC 7222 April 2014
 S. Krishnan, S. Gundavelli, M. Liebsch, H. Yokota & J. Korhonen, "Update Notifications for Proxy Mobile IPv6",   RFC 7077, November 2013
 R. Wakikawa, R. Pazhyannur, S. Gundavelli & C. Perkins, "Separation of Control and User Plane for Proxy Mobile IPv6", RFC 7389, October 2014
 R. Pazhyannur, S. Speicher, S. Gundavelli, J. Korhonen & J. Kaippallimalil, "Extensions to the Proxy Mobile IPv6 (PMIPv6) ANI Option", RFC 7563, June 2015
 T. Melia & S. Gundavelli, "Logical-Interface Support for IP Hosts with Multi-Access Support", RFC 7847, May 2016
 CJ. Bernardos, "Proxy Mobile IPv6 Extensions to Support Flow Mobility", RFC 7864, May 2016
 Z. Yan, J. Lee, & X. Lee, "Home Network Prefix Renumbering in Proxy Mobile IPv6", RFC 8191, August 2017
 D. Patki, S. Gundavelli, J. Lee, Q. Fu, & L. Bertz, "Mobile Access Gateway Configuration Parameters Controlled by the Local Mobility Anchor", RFC 8127, August 2017
 P. Seite, A. Yogin, & S. Gundavelli, "MAG Multipath Binding Option", RFC 8278, January 2018
 S. Gundavelli, "Applicability of Proxy Mobile IPv6 Protocol for WLAN Access Networks",  http://tools.ietf.org/html/draft-gundavelli-netext-pmipv6-wlan-applicability, October 2011
 M. Liebsch & S. Gundavelli, "Proxy Mobile IPv6 inter-working with WiFi Access Authentication", http://tools.ietf.org/html/draft-liebsch-netext-pmip6-authiwk, February, 2011
 S. Gundavelli, M. Grayson, Y. Lee, H. Deng & H. Yokota, "Multiple APN Support for Trusted Wireless LAN Access", http://tools.ietf.org/html/draft-gundavelli-netext-multiple-apn-pmipv6, March 2012

SDO Standards (3GPP, 3GPP2 & WiMAX)
 3GPP SA2, "Architecture for Non-3GPP Access", 3GPP TS 23.402, http://www.3gpp.org/ftp/Specs/archive/23_series/23.402,  October 2008
 3GPP CT4, "Proxy Mobile IPv6 - Stage 3 Specification", 3GPP TS 29.275, http://www.3gpp.org/ftp/Specs/archive/29_series/29.275/29275-a20.zip,  June 2011
 3GPP2,  "Network PMIP Support",  X.S0061-0 v1.0, http://www.3gpp2.org/Public_html/specs/X.S0061-0_v1.0_081209.pdf, December 2008
 WIMAX, "NWG PMIPv6 Stage-3 Specification", http://members.wimaxforum.org/apps/org/workgroup/nwg/download.php/38973/01085_r000_NWG_R1.5_PMIPv6_Stage3_Specification_D1.zip, October 2008

See also
Mobile IP
Host Identity Protocol (HIP)
Identifier/Locator Network Protocol (ILNP)

References

Network protocols